No Ruinous Feud is the eleventh album released by The Incredible String Band in 1973.

This album features the band's folk songs along with new approaches toward reggae pop and rock beats. Tracks like "My Blue Tears" and "Second Fiddle" are evidence of this. Mike Heron would even go as far as abandoning the use of his six-string wire-strung acoustic guitar, custom built by John Bailey.

This is also the first album after the departure of Licorice McKechnie. She would be replaced by Gerard Dott.

Track listing

References

External links
 Making Time

1973 albums
The Incredible String Band albums
Island Records albums